Kimmer Coppejans was the 2012 champion, but was no longer eligible to compete in junior tennis, and thus could not defend his title.
Cristian Garín defeated Alexander Zverev, 6–4, 6–1 in the final to win the title.

Seeds

Qualifiers

Main draw

Finals

Top half

Section 1

Section 2

Bottom half

Section 3

Section 4

References 
Main Draw

Boys' Singles
2013